Dondo language may refer to:

Dondo language (Austronesian)
Doondo language (Bantu)